Ali Karimi (born August 30, 1982) is an Iranian footballer who plays as a striker.

Club career
He played most of his career for his hometown teams Tractor and Shahrdari.

Club career statistics

References

1982 births
Living people
Sportspeople from Tabriz
Iranian footballers
Saipa F.C. players
Pas players
Tractor S.C. players
Shahrdari Tabriz players
Azadegan League players
Association football forwards